Arthur S. Mazmanian (May 1, 1927 – March 22, 2019) was an American baseball coach and manager. He was the longtime baseball coach at Dorsey High School of Los Angeles, his alma mater, then spent 31 seasons (1968–98) as head coach of baseball at Mount San Antonio College of Walnut, California, where his teams won 709 games and had only two losing campaigns. He also was a second baseman, scout, instructor and manager in professional baseball from  through . He died at the age of 91 on March 22, 2019.

Biography 
Mazmanian was born in Detroit, Michigan, to parents who were born in Armenia. After Dorsey High School, he graduated from the University of Southern California, where he was an All-American and the second baseman on the Trojans' 1948 national championship team.

Mazmanian's six-year playing career (1949–54) was largely spent in the New York Yankees' farm system, including 2½ seasons at the Triple-A level with the Kansas City Blues of the American Association. In 1955, he became a coach in the St. Louis Cardinals' organization, then launched his managing career the following season with the Grand Island Athletics, Class D Nebraska State League affiliate of the Kansas City Athletics of the American League. During the 1960s he scouted for the Athletics and the Cleveland Indians. He resumed his managerial career in 1971 and achieved sustained success later in the decade when he rejoined the Yankees as skipper of their Short Season Class-A New York–Penn League affiliate, the Oneonta Yankees. He managed the O-Yankees to five consecutive division championships (1977–81) and four league playoff championships (1977; 1979–81). He then managed in the New York–Penn League for the Baltimore Orioles for three seasons and recorded his last season in organized baseball with a "co-op" team in the same circuit in 1987.

Apart from a temporary assignment with the Visalia Oaks of the California League in 1960, all of Mazmanian's years as a professional baseball manager were spent in "short season" or rookie-level leagues. He compiled a managing record of 663–487 (.576). In 1984, he took a leave of absence from the Orioles to serve as an assistant coach for the United States Olympic Baseball Team.

References

External links

Mount San Antonio College (22 March 2019), "Legendary Coach Maz Passes Away"

1927 births
2019 deaths
All-American college baseball players
American people of Armenian descent
Baseball coaches from California
Baseball players from Los Angeles
Baseball players from Detroit
Beaumont Roughnecks players
Binghamton Triplets players
Cleveland Indians scouts
College baseball coaches
Kansas City Athletics scouts
Kansas City Blues players
Minor league baseball managers
Norfolk Tars players
Omaha Cardinals players
San Francisco Giants scouts
USC Trojans baseball players
Visalia Oaks players